"So Cold the Night" is a song by British duo the Communards released in November 1986 as the final single from their debut album Communards. It was the their second top-ten hit, peaking at number 8 on the UK Singles Chart.

Release and reception
"So Cold the Night" was released with the B-side "When the Walls Come Tumbling Down", also written by the duo, and was dedicated to Nelson Mandela. The 12-inch single was released with the additional B-side "Never No More". A remix of "So Cold the Night" was released as a 12-inch single in December 1986. It was a double A-side single with "When the Walls Come Tumbling Down" and "The Multimix", a medley remix of "Don't Leave Me This Way", "So Cold the Night" and "Disenchanted".

Reviewing for Record Mirror, Jane Wilkes wrote "clandestine meetings and hi-NRG Balkan folk music engage for this Somerville/Coles composition. Their cover versions have always maintained an ambiguity, whereas their own songs place you right in the picture regarding their sexual/political stance".

Track listing
7": London / LON 110
 "So Cold the Night" – 4:39
 "When the Walls Come Tumbling Down" – 4:20

7": London / LONDJ 110 (promo)
 "So Cold the Night" – 3:45
 "So Cold the Night" (Full Length) – 4:40

12": London / LONX 110
 "So Cold the Night" – 9:12
 "When the Walls Come Tumbling Down" – 4:22
 "Never No More" – 2:58

12": London / LONXR 110
 "So Cold the Night" – 8:34
 "The Multimix" – 8:00
 "When the Walls Come Tumbling Down" – 4:21

12": London / LONX 110 (promo)
 "So Cold the Night" – 9:12
 "So Cold the Night" (Instrumental) – 9:12

12": London / LDSX 235 (Canada)
 "So Cold the Night" (Remixed Club Version) – 8:45
 "So Cold the Night" (7" Version) – 3:45
 "So Cold the Night" (Instrumental) – 9:45

Cassette: London / LONCS 110
 "So Cold the Night"
 "When the Walls Come Tumbling Down"
 "Never No More"
 "Don't Leave Me This Way" (Son of Gotham City)

Charts

Weekly charts

Year-end charts

References

1986 songs
1986 singles
The Communards songs
London Records singles
Music videos directed by Andy Morahan
Song recordings produced by Mike Thorne
Songs written by Jimmy Somerville